The 1910 Lafayette football team was an American football team that represented Lafayette College as an independent during the 1910 college football season. In its second season under head coach Bob Folwell, the team compiled a 7–2 record and shut out seven of its opponents. Edwin Foresman was the team captain.  The team played its home games at March Field in Easton, Pennsylvania.

Schedule

References

Lafayette
Lafayette Leopards football seasons
Lafayette football